

Ion Negrei (born 12 March 1958) is a Moldovan politician.

Biography 

He was the Deputy Prime Minister in charge of social issues in First Vlad Filat Cabinet. He was replaced by Mihai Moldovanu in the Second Filat Cabinet. Negrei became head of the Movement to Celebrate the 1812 annexation of Bessarabia to the Russian Empire.

He is a member of the Liberal Party (Moldova).

Gallery

Notes

External links  
 Ion NEGREI, Deputy Prime Minister of the Republic of Moldova 
 Government of Moldova 
 Site-ul Partidului Liberal
 Site-ul Guvernului Republicii Moldova 
 "Istoria integrată" - blamată de istorici, promovată de guvernanţi 
 Europa Libera: Noul guvern a primit votul de încredere al Parlamentului 

 

1958 births
Politicians from Chișinău
Living people
20th-century Moldovan historians
Deputy Prime Ministers of Moldova
Liberal Party (Moldova) politicians
Alexandru Ioan Cuza University alumni
Recipients of the Order of Honour (Moldova)